Aquapark Zambrone was the first water park in Southern Italy, located on the coast of the comune of Zambrone in the Province of Vibo Valentia. The World Waterpark Association calls it "one of the largest and most famous waterparks of Southern Italy". Construction began on January 11, 1989, and seven months later, on August 13 of the same year, its gates were opened for the first time to the public. The  park closed in 2007 to make way to a luxury resort hotel.

References

Amusement parks in Italy
Defunct amusement parks
Buildings and structures in the Province of Vibo Valentia
1989 establishments in Italy
2007 disestablishments in Italy
Amusement parks opened in 1989
Amusement parks closed in 2007